Timothy Bigelow (August 12, 1739 in Worcester, Massachusetts, British America – March 31, 1790 in Worcester, Massachusetts, United States of America) fought as a patriot in the American Revolution.

Biography
At the beginning of the American Revolution, he was working as a blacksmith at Worcester. He was a delegate to the Massachusetts Provincial Congress, participated in the Committee of Correspondence, fought in the Battles of Lexington and Concord, and served as colonel of the 15th Massachusetts Regiment of the Continental Army. He accompanied Benedict Arnold in his expedition to Quebec in 1775, and was captured there, remaining a prisoner until 1776. He was made colonel on February 8, 1777, and, when in command of the 15th Massachusetts Regiment, assisted at the capture of John Burgoyne. He was also at Valley Forge, West Point, Monmouth, and Yorktown. After the war, Bigelow had charge of the Springfield Arsenal. He was a benefactor of the academy at Leicester, Massachusetts.

Family
He married Anna Andrews. They had six children together: Nancy Bigelow (born 1765, married Abraham Lincoln of Worcester), Timothy Bigelow (1767-1821; married Lucy Prescott, niece of William Prescott), Andrew Bigelow (born 1769; died unmarried), Rufus Bigelow (born 1772; died unmarried), Lucy Bigelow (born 1774; married Luther Lawrence), and Clara Bigelow (born 1781; married Tyler Bigelow).

Memorials
Mount Bigelow (Maine) and (consequently) the Bigelow Preserve (Maine) are named after Timothy Bigelow. In 1861, Bigelow's grandson erected the Bigelow Monument in his memory in Worcester, Massachusetts. With others, Timothy Bigelow obtained a grant for 23,040 acres on October 21, 1780, on which was founded the town of Montpelier, Vermont, now the capital of Vermont. It was named by him.

References

External links
 Col. Timothy Bigelow Monument
 
 
 

1739 births
1790 deaths
Continental Army officers from Massachusetts
People from Worcester, Massachusetts